Southern Ocean Observing System (SOOS) is an international initiative of the Scientific Committee on Antarctic Research (SCAR) and the Scientific Committee on Oceanic Research (SCOR). It was officially launched in 2011. Its International Project Office is hosted by the  Institute for Marine and Antarctic Studies (IMAS), University of Tasmania, Australia.

The Southern Ocean comprises the southernmost waters of the World Ocean, generally taken to be south of 60° S latitude and encircling Antarctica. As such, it is regarded as the second-smallest of the five principal oceanic divisions: smaller than the Pacific, Atlantic, and Indian oceans but larger than the Arctic Ocean. Over the past 30 years, the Southern Ocean has been subject to rapid climate change, which has led to changes in the marine ecosystem.

SOOS is designed to aid the collection and delivery of essential observations on dynamics and change of Southern Ocean systems to all international stakeholders (researchers, governments, industries). It seeks to enable the design, advocacy and implementation of cost-effective observing and data delivery systems.

References 

Oceanography
Ecological experiments